The Harbor Towers are two 40-story residential towers located on the waterfront of Boston, Massachusetts, located between the New England Aquarium and the Rowes Wharf mixed-use development. Harbor Towers I is in a tie as 36th-tallest building in Boston. They were designed by Henry N. Cobb of I. M. Pei & Partners.

Initially built as affordable rental housing, the Harbor Towers opened in 1971.  At the time, the area surrounding the project was a warehouse district with many surface parking lots.

History

Development and construction

The Harbor Towers apartment complex was completed in 1971 by the Berenson Corporation as an affordable housing option near Boston's financial district. The towers were designed by Henry N. Cobb, who also designed Boston's John Hancock Tower and collaborated with I.M Pei on Boston's City Hall Plaza. In 2006, they were the city's tallest residential towers. The towers were sponsored by the Boston Redevelopment Authority (BRA) to revitalize Boston's waterfront.

Originally planned as three 40-story towers, only two were built alongside a parking garage. The design garnered many critics in Boston for its brutalist architecture, a style inconsistent with historic Boston.

Condominium conversion
As the growth of the city moved toward the waterfront, the development's location drew attention during the "condominium conversion" craze of the early 1980s. In 1981, both apartment towers started a two-year process of conversion to over 600 condominiums, with incentives for existing renters to purchase at discounted prices. Some of these "early adopters" now own multimillion-dollar units, with as little as US$100,000 to $200,000 total investment. Newcomers to the building buy units for $600,000 to as much as $3 million.

Over the decades, the towers have undergone major renovations, including the replacement of all the windows with high-end double-pane windows and replacement of the electrical and HVAC systems. Severe corrosion of the heating and cooling water pipes led to them being replaced by copper pipes in 2009.

Architectural details
The apartments are organized in a pinwheel fashion around a central core and are made of cast in place reinforced concrete. The concrete exterior balconies have a giant zipper-like appearance against the flat façade.

The stainless steel sculpture at the base of the buildings is Untitled Landscape by David von Schlegell, and was created in 1964. The artwork is often mistaken for solar panels.

Zoning

School district
Any school-age children living in the towers are eligible for the Boston Public Schools. For elementary and middle school, students may apply to:
 Any school within the location's "assignment zone"
In this case, the North Zone 
 Any school within the location's "walk zone," regardless of the school's "assignment zone."
Eligible "walk zone" schools not citywide and not within the North Zone: Gavin Middle School 
 Any citywide elementary school, middle school, and K-8

All high schools are "citywide."

See also

 List of tallest buildings in Boston

References

External links

Harbor Towers Official Page
Boston Harborwalk, history of site
Photo of "Untitled Landscape" by David von Schlegell
Harbor Towers Condo Assessment Explained

Residential skyscrapers in Boston
Residential condominiums in the United States
Residential buildings completed in 1971
Brutalist architecture in Massachusetts